Marian Anderson: The Lincoln Memorial Concert is a 1939 documentary film that documents a concert performance by African American opera singer Marian Anderson after the Daughters of the American Revolution (DAR) had her barred from singing in Washington D.C.'s Constitution Hall because she was Black. Officials of the District of Columbia also barred her from performing in the auditorium of a white public high school. First Lady Eleanor Roosevelt helped hold the concert at Lincoln Memorial, on federal property.  The performance on Easter Sunday, April 9, 1939, was attended by 75,000.  In 2001, this documentary film was selected for preservation in the National Film Registry by the Library of Congress.

Notes

External links

1939 documentary films
1939 films
Concert films
United States National Film Registry films
Black-and-white documentary films
Documentary films about African Americans
Documentary films about singers
Documentary films about racism in the United States
Films about opera
Documentary films about women in music
Documentary films about classical music and musicians
Films shot in Washington, D.C.
1939 in the United States
1939 in American music
1939 in American cinema
American black-and-white films
American documentary films
1930s American films